Shannon Turner may refer to:

 Shannon Turner (ice hockey), Canadian ice hockey player
 Shannon Turner (footballer), Northern Irish footballer